Douglas J. Cohen is an American composer and lyricist. He is a member of ASCAP, BMI Lehman Engel Musical Theater Workshop, and the Dramatists Guild of America.

Works
The Big Time - Book by Douglas Carter Beane, music & lyrics by Cohen.
No Way To Treat A Lady
 The Gig
Children's Letters to God - Book by Stoo Hample, music by David Evans, and lyrics by Cohen
The Opposite of Sex
Barnstormer - with Cheryl L. Davis
Glimmerglass - Book by Jonathan Bolt and lyrics by Ted Drachman
A Charles Dickens Christmas
Boozy
Valentino's Tango - Music by Howard Marren
Columbus
When The Cookie Crumbles, You Can Still Pick Up The Pieces
God's  Hand

Awards and grants
Richard Rodgers Development Grant from American Academy and Institute of Arts and Letters - (No Way To Treat A Lady)
Richard Rodgers Development Grant from American Academy and Institute of Arts and Letters - (The Gig)
 Nominated for 2 Outer Critics Circle Award (No Way To Treat A Lady)
 1998 Gilman & Gonzalez-Falla Theatre Foundation Award - (Glimmerglass, No Way To Treat A Lady, The Big Time, The Gig)
 2005 Jonathan Larson Award - (Barnstormer)
 2005 Drama Desk Award nomination for Outstanding Lyricist - (Children's Letters to God)
 2009 Nöel Coward Award - (The Gig)

References

American musical theatre composers
American musical theatre lyricists
Living people
American male composers
Year of birth missing (living people)